(born 7 February 1965 in Fukuoka) is a former Japanese rugby union player who played as a winger.

Biography
Graduated in the Fukuoka Institute of Technology, with which he played the All-Japan Rugby University Championship, until he joined Suntory to play the All-Japan Rugby Company Championship. He was also capped in the Japan national team in 1987, in the 1987 Rugby World Cup match against Australia, at Sydney, where he scored a drop goal. His last cap was also in 1987, against New Zealand at Tokyo, on 1 November 1987. He also played for Japan Universities national team and for Kyushu representative team.

Notes

External links

1965 births
Living people
Japanese rugby union players
Rugby union wings
Sportspeople from Fukuoka Prefecture
Tokyo Sungoliath players
Japan international rugby union players
Fukuoka Institute of Technology alumni